Tudor Vladimirescu is a commune located in Brăila County, Muntenia, Romania. It is composed of three villages: Comăneasca, Scorțaru Vechi and Tudor Vladimirescu. Until 2003, it included Cazasu village, which was split off that year to form a separate commune.

References

Communes in Brăila County
Localities in Muntenia